Star Vijay Music or Vijay Music is a 24×7 Indian Tamil Music genre Television Channel that was launched on 4 October 2020 during the grand launch of Bigg Boss Tamil Season 4 by Kamal Haasan. It is the fourth channel of Star India launched in Tamil after Star Vijay, Star Vijay Super and Star Sports 1 Tamil.

Launch 
Launched by actor Kamal Haasan during the grand launch of Bigg Boss Tamil Season 4 on 4 October 2020

A series Adhisaya Piraviyum Arpudha Pennum, dubbed version of Yehh Jadu Hai Jinn Ka, which earlier aired on Star Vijay and ended airing 60 episodes every Sundays, continues airing from 3 May 2021 on Weekdays from 9:00 PM to 10:00 PM.

Programming 

It mainly broadcasts Music shows. Some of the shows broadcast by Vijay Music are listed below:

Kaapi Kaapi The show features the latest and trending songs, songs from movies to be released, song dedication with loads of other elements. It broadcasts from 6:00 AM to 8:00 AM.
Adhiradi Mornings the schedule starts with a morning show from 8:00 AM to 9:00 AM.

 Start The Beatu from 9:00 AM to 10:00 AM.
 Happy Birthday Makkals which wishes people and dedicates songs for their Birthdays. It broadcasts from 10:00 AM to 11:00 AM.
 Star Hits from 11:00 AM to 12:00 PM
 Paatu + Faactu It shows some Trivias with songs. It broadcasts from 12:00 PM to 1:00 PM.
 Aduthu Aduthu Paatu It shows songs back to back without ad-break.
 Vijay Music Paatu League Music reality show. It broadcasts from 3:00 PM to 4:00 PM
Makkals Manathil The show features the latest and trending songs, songs from movies to be released, song dedication with loads of other elements. It broadcasts from 4:00 PM to 5:00 PM. 
In Trendu The show features the latest and trending songs, songs from movies to be released, song dedication with loads of other elements. It broadcasts from 5:00 PM to 7:00 PM.
Isai Meter The show will have a combination of peppy and Refreshing songs. It broadcasts from 7:00 PM to 8:00 PM.
 Adhisaya Piraviyum Arpudha Pennum A show other than music in the channel; fantasy series. It broadcasts from 9:00 PM to 10:00 PM.
Sa..Ri..Gaa..Naa The show features the latest and trending songs, songs from movies to be released, song dedication with loads of other elements. It broadcasts from 10.00 PM to 11.00 PM.
Melody Hits The show features the latest and trending songs, songs from movies to be released, song dedication with loads of other elements. It broadcasts from 12:00 PM to 6:00 AM.
''Lyrics Oda Paatu The show broadcasts Tamil songs with lyrics.

And many other programs.

References 

Tamil-language television channels
Television channels and stations established in 1994
Television stations in Chennai
Disney Star
Music television channels
Music television channels in India